Chinese Annals of Mathematics, Series B is a peer-reviewed mathematics journal focusing on pure and applied mathematics published by Springer.
The journal was founded in 1983 when it was split from Chinese Annals of Mathematics. It is indexed by Mathematical Reviews and Zentralblatt MATH.
According to the Journal Citation Reports, the journal has a 2020 impact factor of 0.756.

References

External links
 

Mathematics journals
Publications established in 1983
English-language journals
Springer Science+Business Media academic journals
Bimonthly journals